This is a list of people with given name Lloyd.

Lloyd (singer) (born 1986), American R&B artist
Lloyd Oscar Abeyaratne (1893-1978), Sri Lankan Sinhala pediatrician 
Lloyd Alexander (1924–2007), American writer, author of The Chronicles of Prydain
Lloyd Austin (born 1953), American retired army general and Secretary of Defense of the United States
Lloyd Anoaʻi (born 1971), American professional wrestler and member of the Anoa'i family
Lloyd Banks (born 1982), American rapper of G-Unit
Lloyd Bentsen (1921–2006), United States Senator and Secretary of the Treasury
Lloyd Blankfein (born 1954), chairman of the board and CEO of Goldman Sachs
Lloyd Bradley (born 1955), British music journalist and author
Lloyd Bridges (1913–1998), American actor
Lloyd Burdick (1909–1945), American football player
Lloyd Burns (born 1984), Wales international rugby union player
Lloyd Cadena (1993–2020), Filipino vlogger, radio personality, and author
Lloyd Carr (born 1945), American college football coach
Lloyd Christopher (1919–1991), Filipino professional pool player
Lloyd Cole (born 1961), English singer and songwriter
John Lloyd Cruz (born 1983), Filipino actor, model, and television host
Lloyd Cushenberry (born 1997), American football player
Lloyd Doyley (born 1982), English football player
Lloyd Gaston (1929–2006), Canadian theologian and professor
Lloyd Geering (born 1918), New Zealand atheistic theologian and centenarian
Lloyd Harris (tennis) (born 1997), South African tennis player
Lloyd Honeyghan (born 1960), retired British/Jamaican boxer
Lloyd LaCuesta, television journalist
Lloyd Lindsay Young (born 1941), American television weatherman
Lloyd Loar (1886–1943), American sound engineer and musical instrument designer
Lloyd Bryan Molander (born 1961), American Producer
Lloyd Metzler (1913–1980), American economist
Lloyd H. Paterson (1925–1988), New York politician
Lloyd Patterson (born 1957), American player of Canadian football
Lloyd Perrett (born 1994), New Zealand-Australian rugby league player
Lloyd Pollock (1909–1993), president of the Canadian Amateur Hockey Association
Lloyd Pope (born 1999), Australian cricketer
Lloyd Price, (1933–2021), American R&B singer who sang the 1954 hit "Lawdy Miss Clawdy"
Lloyd Reckord (1929–2015), Jamaican actor, film maker and stage director 
Lloyd Robertson (born 1934), veteran Canadian television news anchor (CTV) 
Lloyd Shapley (1923–2016), American mathematician and Nobel Prize–winning economist
Lloyd Thomas (1912–1942), American naval officer
Lloyd F. Wheat (1923–2004), American politician
Lloyd Williams (disambiguation), several people

See also
Sir Alan Lloyd Hodgkin, British physiologist, biophysicist and Nobel Prize winner
Frank Lloyd Wright, American architect
Eirene Lloyd White, British politician
Lloy Ball (born 1972), American volleyball player
Loyd (disambiguation), includes a list of people with given name Loyd

Lists of people by given name

fr:Lloyd
nl:Lloyd
nn:Lloyd
pl:Lloyd
sv:Lloyd